Wark on Tyne is a small village and civil parish in Northumberland, England,  north of Hexham.

History

The name is derived from the Anglo-Saxon word for earthworks, and refers to the mound at the south of the village. Wark was once the capital town of Tynedale. A Bronze Age stone circle known as The Goatstones is near Ravensheugh crags in the parish. Wark Town Hall is a Grade II listed building which was completed in 1874.

Governance
Wark  is in the parliamentary constituency of Hexham. Guy Opperman of the Conservative Party is the Member of Parliament.

Prior to Brexit, for the European Parliament its residents voted to elect MEP's for the North East England constituency.

For Local Government purposes it belongs to Northumberland County Council a unitary authority.

Transport
Wark was served by Wark railway station on the Border Counties Railway which linked the Newcastle & Carlisle Railway, near Hexham, with the Border Union Railway at Riccarton Junction in Scotland. The first section of the route was opened between Hexham and Chollerford in 1858, the remainder opening in 1862. The line was closed to passengers by British Railways in 1956. Part of the line is now beneath the surface of the Kielder Water reservoir. Wark Bridge crosses the River North Tyne.

References

External links
Images and History of Wark Castle site
GENUKI (accessed: 14 November 2008) 	
Northumberland Communities (accessed: 14 November 2008)

Villages in Northumberland
Civil parishes in Northumberland